The 2011–12 Mid Wales Football League began on 13 August 2011. Division 1 ended on 5 May 2012 and Division 2 ended on 13 May 2012.

Division 1

League table

Results

Division 2

League table

Results

References

External links
 SPAR Mid-Wales Football League

Mid Wales Football League seasons
3
Wales